was a feudal domain under the Tokugawa shogunate of Edo period Japan, located in Kōzuke Province (modern-day Gunma Prefecture), Japan. It was centered on Nanokaichi jin'ya in what is now part of the city of Tomioka, Gunma. Parts of the jin'ya, including the daimyō residence and gardens are preserved on the original site (now part of Tomioka High School). Nanokaichi was ruled throughout its history by a junior branch of the Maeda clan of Kaga.

History
Maeda Toshitaka, the 5th son of Maeda Toshiie was awarded a fief of 10,000 koku by Tokugawa Ieyasu for his services during the Siege of Osaka. The location of the new holding in Kōzuke Province was selected partly to provide the Maeda clan a convenient stopping point in the sankin-kōtai procession to the shōgun's court in Edo.

During the rule of Maeda Toshiyoshi, the 11th daimyō of Nanokaichi, an extensive fiscal reform program was undertaken. However, during the rule of his successor, Maeda Toshiakira, although a domain academy was established, the jin'ya along with most of the town burned down in a fire and the domain suffered from repeated crop failures, leading to a request for assistance to the parent house in Kaga Domain. 

During the Boshin War, the domain sided with the imperial forces. After the end of the conflict, with the abolition of the han system in July 1871, Nanokaichi Domain became Nanokaichi Prefecture, which later became part of Gunma Prefecture. 
The domain had a population of 614 in 174 households per a census in 1840. The domain's residence in Edo was located near Hanzōmon

Holdings at the end of the Edo period
Unlike most domains in the han system, which typically consisted of several discontinuous territories calculated to provide the assigned kokudaka, based on periodic cadastral surveys and projected agricultural yields. Nanokaichi Domain was a unitary domain with 21 villages in Kanra District, Kōzuke Province.

Kōzuke Province
21 villages in Kanra District

List of daimyōs

References

External links
 Nanokaichi on "Edo 300 HTML"

Notes

Domains of Japan
1615 establishments in Japan
States and territories established in 1615
1871 disestablishments in Japan
States and territories disestablished in 1871
Kōzuke Province
History of Gunma Prefecture
Maeda clan